Sesa Football Academy (SFA) is a football academy based in Sanquelim, Goa. Originally founded in the 1960s as Sesa Sports Club, its football team competes in the Goa Professional League, and previously participated in NFL II and I-League 2nd Division. SFA is a unit of Sesa Community Development Foundation, which is promoted by Vedanta Limited with the objective of service to the community in its operational areas.

SFA began functioning in June 1999. All expenses including the academic studies are taken care of by the academy.

Sesa Football Academy was the champion of the Goa First Division League in the 2018–19 season, and gained automatic promotion to the Goa Professional League, where they will play in the 2019–20 season.

History 
Sesa Football Academy is the successor of Sesa Sports Club, which was originally founded during the 1960s. In 1988, British coach Bob Bootland took charge of Sesa. SFA was later established in 1999 with a vision of becoming a premier academy in India, producing footballers for the Indian national team from the state of Goa. The academy identifies talented youngsters with the passion for football, inducts them into the residential program at the academy, and over a period of four years nurtures and develops them as professional footballers and well-disciplined citizens.

The academy's activities have yielded positive results – seven SFA alumni have played for the national team, and eight players took part in the latest edition of the Indian Super League. Some notable alumni include Adil Khan, Denzil Franco, Micky Fernandes, and Pratesh Shirodkar.

Till date, more than 150 players have benefited from SFA's programs, out of which some have played internationally and many others have represented various prestigious clubs of the country. The team was later managed by legendary Indian coach Armando Colaco. Nigerian Clifford Chukwuma also managed SESA.

Football programs

Residential academies 
Affiliated with the Goa Football Association (GFA), Sesa Football Academy presently runs two residential campuses – Sanquelim campus, which began its functioning in June 1999; and Sirsaim campus, which was established in June 2008. Both academies are fully residential with on-site accommodation and all other amenities required for the development of a footballer, including gym, medical facilities, nutrition and boarding facilities, recreational facilities, etc.

Students are also given orientation in sports medicine, physiological assessment and physiotherapy. The academy is AIFF-accredited, and hosts the AIFF Youth Leagues at their campus.

Since they are firmly entrenched in the Vedanta Group's CSR activity, SFA does not charge its students, and all expenses related to student welfare, education, transportation, etc. are borne by SFA.

Sanquelim Campus 
The Sanquelim campus, with 36 players, is a four-year residential program admitting 18 students every two years. It is built on the Sanquelim reclaimed mine site, with a beautiful football ground, well-established gymnasium, and a complete hostel facility along with a recreation center.

Sirsaim Campus 
To further nurture the young talent with football training and to provide a disciplined regime, new infrastructure at Sirsaim was inaugurated on 14 February 2010. Constructed at an approximate cost of Rs. 4 crores, it has state of the art infrastructure at international standards. The Sirsaim academy currently has 30 trainees in its four-year residential program, with a batch of 15 trainees admitted every two years.

Staff 
To guide the technical aspects of both academies, a UEFA Pro License holder Spanish coach Eduard Batlle Basart was roped in as technical director for Sesa Football Academy in 2017. He previously worked with the youth teams at European giants Manchester United and FC Barcelona.

Sesa Football Academy has a full-fledged staff including two Head Coaches who plan and execute the training program, along with the support of doctors, physiotherapists, and other staff to assist and manage the affairs of the teams and the academies.

Arjuna awardee and ex-Indian captain Brahmanand Sankhwalkar has served as Chief Mentor of Sesa Football Academy.

Vedanta Football Schools 
In line with its objective of identifying and promoting young talent, SFA launched Vedanta Football Schools in 2012 to identify boys from nearby schools under the age of 14 years, and provide them non-residential football training. This is in line with the larger vision of community development in the areas where Vedanta operates.

Currently SFA operates 4 football schools, at Majorda, Nuvem, Sanguem and Thivim. These centers have proved to be a feeding pool for the academy, with 6 students from these schools making it to the residential academy.

Vedanta Women's League 
Working towards the aim of women empowerment through football, Sesa Football Academy launched the Vedanta Women's League in 2017, with the support of Goa Football Association. The league was inaugurated by then Goa Chief Minister Manohar Parrikar in the presence of eminent women's football legends.

The Vedanta Women's League has since completed two seasons, with over 200 girls given an opportunity to play football. The winner of the 2018 edition, Panjim Footballers, went on to play in the Indian Women's League as the sole team from Goa.

Home ground
Sircaim is home to one of the two Sesa Football Academy premises in Goa, the other being at Sanquelim. The Sesa Football Academy Ground is located at Sircaim and use for both training and league matches.

Sesa also used Duler AstroTurf Stadium in Mapusa for some of their Goa Professional League matches.

Honours

League
Goa First Division/Goa Pro League
Champions (3): 1967–68, 1972–73, 2018–19

Cup
 Sikkim Governor's Gold Cup
Champions (1): 1987
Bandodkar Gold Trophy
Champions (2): 1979, 1980
Runners-up (1): 1974
Rovers Cup
Runners-up (1): 1995
 Sait Nagjee Football Tournament
Runners-up (1): 1970
 Vitthal Trophy
Champions (1): 1989
Runners-up (1): 1990
 Goa Police Cup
Champions (2): 1970, 2022

Affiliated clubs 
The following club(s) is/are currently associated with Sesa FA:

  Zinc Football (2018–present)

See also
List of football clubs in Goa
List of Goan State Football Champions

References

Further reading

External links
Sesa Football Academy at All India Football Federation
Sesa Football Academy at Soccerway

SESA Football Academy
Association football clubs established in 1999
Football clubs in Goa
I-League clubs
1999 establishments in Goa
Youth League U18
Vedanta Resources
I-League 2nd Division clubs